Polercoaster is a type of amusement ride offered by US Thrill Rides and Intamin. An installation consists of a large tower structure which features glass elevators to an observation deck, as well as a steel roller coaster wrapping around the tower. The model was first introduced in 2012, and in 2013, four were proposed for construction. However, none have been constructed as of 2023.

History
At the 2011 International Association of Amusement Parks and Attractions (IAAPA) Trade Show in Orlando, Florida, the Polercoaster was initially announced as a joint venture between US Thrill Rides and S&S Worldwide. US Thrill Rides' Bill and Michael Kitchen invented the concept to allow amusement parks with little available space to be able to design a full-size roller coaster. S&S Worldwide would manufacture roller coaster component, which would be designed by Alan Schilke. US Thrill Rides and S&S Worldwide would have subcontract parts of the ride's fabrication to Celtic Engineering and Haskell Steel.

Bill Kitchen was pleased with the ride's initial reception at the show stating "we should have firm contracts signed by the end of the year", with anticipation that at least one installation would open in 2014. The first contracts were announced in late 2013 with design and construction expected to take 24 months.

In July 2015, it was announced that the supply contract for the Orlando Polarcoaster had been awarded to Intamin, and that S&S was no longer involved.

On December 21, 2022, US Thrill Rides, the ride’s manufacturer, filed for Chapter 11 bankruptcy.

Specifications
General specifications of the ride were listed at the Polercoaster's debut at IAAPA 2011. Two glass elevators would transport riders to the top of the tower. This area could feature dining or retail space, or the potential for a dark ride. Statistics of the two standard towers that were proposed are shown in the table below.

Installations
LakePoint Sporting Community in Georgia, United States was announced as the first installation of a Polercoaster. The project has stalled, however, and as of December 1, 2015, there was no mention of the Polercoaster on LakePoint Sporting Community's website.

A second sale of the ride was confirmed for a Florida location at the IAAPA Trade Show in 2013. The location was officially confirmed on June 5, 2014 as going to the new Mango's Tropical Cafe development project on International Drive in Orlando, Florida, as well as the roller coaster's name, Skyscraper.

In May 2015, Wallack Holdings, who was developing the Orlando Polercoaster, was reported to be in talks to build a Polercoaster on the Atlantic City Boardwalk. However, no updates nor construction have been made. The project was assumed to be cancelled, just as groundbreaking and construction was due to begin.

References

External links
 
 

Intamin
S&S – Sansei Technologies
Companies that filed for Chapter 11 bankruptcy in 2022